Moyeuvre-Grande is a commune in the Moselle department in Grand Est in north-eastern France.

Since 1986 Moyeuvre-Grande has been twinned with Snodland, a town of similar size, located in Kent, England.

Population

Personalities 
 Mireille Guiliano, American and French author, born in 1946.
 Hugues Occansey, basketball player
 Jean-Maurice de Montremy, author

See also 
 Communes of the Moselle department

References

External links 

 Official Site

Moyeuvregrande